Nick Zeijlmans (born 20 February 1996) is a Dutch football player who plays for ADO '20.

Club career
He made his professional debut in the Eerste Divisie for FC Volendam on 15 February 2016 in a game against Helmond Sport.

On 12 January 2020, he agreed to join ADO '20 for the 2020–21 season.

References

External links
 

1996 births
Sportspeople from Alkmaar
Living people
Dutch footballers
Association football defenders
FC Volendam players
OFC Oostzaan players
Rijnsburgse Boys players
ADO '20 players
Eerste Divisie players
Tweede Divisie players
Derde Divisie players
AFC '34 players
Footballers from North Holland